David Dunbar (14 September 1886 – 7 November 1953) was an Australian film actor. Dunbar was a prominent actor in American and British silent films, particularly in westerns, but switched to playing more minor roles after the arrival of sound. In later years he appeared mostly in British-themed Hollywood films. He was one of the first film actors beginning his screen career with Pathe Freres, Paris in 1910. Previously he was an actor on the legitimate stage both in Australia, his homeland and in Britain. On 7 March 1926 his wife Blanche was killed in a car collision in the Hollywood Hills. He had one sister, Miriam Kathleen (Strachan) Dunbar who remained in Petersham, New South Wales. Miriam married William Thomas Strachan, the children of that marriage being Miriam Kathleen and William James Strachan. William James (Bill) returned from the Second World War to Australia and settled with his wife Barbara (Grant) Strachan in Sydney and later in Melbourne, Victoria, bringing up three children, Susan Marion, William Grant and Scott James Strachan. The Strachan family included Graeme Ronald (Shirley) Strachan, a media personality and lead singer of the 1970s rock group Skyhooks. Miriam Kathleen married Ronald George Fordham, who perished as a prisoner of war in Malaya during the Second World War. Miriam Kathleen died in 1944, leaving Brian Ronald and Joan Fordham.

Partial filmography

Leatherstocking (1924) - Chingachgook
The Fortieth Door (1924) - Andy McLean
Trail Dust (1924) - Joe Paden
Shootin' Square (1924) - (uncredited)
North of 36 (1924) - Dell Williams
Ridin' the Wind (1924)
 Fair Play (1925) - Bull Mong
Galloping Vengeance (1925) - Duke Granby
The White Desert (1925)
 The Bloodhound (1925) - Rambo
Ridin' the Wind (1925) - Leader of the Black Hat Gang
A Man of Nerve (1925) - Rangey Greer
The Cowboy Musketeer (1925) - Tony Vaquerrelli
Beyond the Rockies (1926) - Cottle
The Non-Stop Flight (1926) - Captain Karl Kruger
The Galloping Cowboy (1926) - Pedro
The Fighting Marine (1927)
The Arizona Whirlwind (1927) - Bert Hawley
The King of Kings (1927) - (uncredited)
The Broncho Buster (1927) - Curtis Harris
The Fighting Hombre (1927) - 'Goldstud' Hopkins
The Boy Rider (1927) - Bill Hargus
Gold from Weepah (1927)
The Streets of London (1929) - Gideon Bloodgood
The Second Mate (1929) - Jack Arkwright
Human Cargo (1929) - Inspector Benson
Three Men in a Cart (1929)
Plunging Hoofs (1929) - 'Squint' Jones
Downstream (1929) - Digger Brent
The Return of Dr. Fu Manchu (1930) - Detective Lawrence (uncredited)
 Shock (1934) - Sergeant Matthews (uncredited)
One More River (1934) - Chauffeur at Station (uncredited)
Clive of India (1935) - Clerk (uncredited)
Les Misérables (1935) - Gendarme in Prefect's Office (uncredited)
A Feather in Her Hat (1935) - Truck Driver (uncredited)
The Great Impersonation (1935) - English Farmer (uncredited)
Little Lord Fauntleroy (1936) - Jeffries - Carriage Driver (uncredited)
Under Two Flags (1936) - Chasseur Officer (uncredited)
Dracula's Daughter (1936) - Motor Bobby (uncredited)
Bulldog Drummond's Peril (1938) - Constable (uncredited)
A Christmas Carol (1938) - (uncredited)
Rulers of the Sea (1939) - Boatswain (uncredited)
The Earl of Chicago (1940) - Plowman (uncredited)
Escape to Glory (1940) - Sailor (uncredited)
Those Were the Days! (1940) - Bakeman (uncredited)
North West Mounted Police (1940) - Vitale (uncredited)
Dr. Jekyll and Mr. Hyde (1941) - Footman (uncredited)
The Blonde from Singapore (1941) - Turnkey (uncredited)
Confirm or Deny (1941) - Workman (uncredited)
Mrs. Miniver (1942) - Man in Store (uncredited)
Green Dolphin Street (1947) - Captain's Voice (uncredited)
Forever Amber (1947) - Ruffian (uncredited)
If Winter Comes (1947) - Milkman (uncredited)
A Woman's Vengeance (1948) - Workman (uncredited)
Summer Holiday (1948) - Spirit of '76 (uncredited)
Kiss the Blood Off My Hands (1948) - Large Man (uncredited)
Joan of Arc (1948) - English Soldier (uncredited)
Hills of Home (1948) - Barker for Whisky (uncredited)
Challenge to Lassie (1949) - Driver (uncredited)
That Forsyte Woman (1949) - Driver (uncredited)
Young Man with a Horn (1950) - Alcoholic Bum (uncredited)
The Milkman (1950) - Bill (uncredited)
Dallas (1950) - Prisoner (uncredited)
Soldiers Three (1951) - Cavalryman (uncredited)
The Law and the Lady (1951) - Driver (uncredited)
Thunder on the Hill (1951) - Minor Role (uncredited)
The Lady and the Bandit (1951) - Coachman (uncredited)
Anne of the Indies (1951) - Capt. Crockett (uncredited)
The Son of Dr. Jekyll (1951) - Man in Bar (uncredited)
Million Dollar Mermaid (1952) - Minor Role (uncredited)
Rogue's March (1953) - Sgt. Major (uncredited)
Knock on Wood (1954) - English Desk Clerk (uncredited) (final film role)

References

Bibliography
Low, Rachel. The History of British Film: Volume IV, 1918–1929. Routledge, 1997.
Wooley, John. Shot in Oklahoma: A Century of Sooner State Cinema. University of Oklahoma Press, 2012.

External links

1886 births
1953 deaths
Australian male silent film actors
People from Maitland, New South Wales
20th-century Australian male actors
Australian expatriate male actors in the United States